Richard Bryan "Twig" Little (born October 8, 1959) is a former American professional baseball player. He played all or part of five seasons in Major League Baseball, primarily as a second baseman. He currently works for the Chicago White Sox as an advance scout and special instructor, a position he has held since 2001.

Bryan is the brother of former major league manager Grady Little.

Notes

External links 

1959 births
Living people
Albany-Colonie Yankees players
American expatriate baseball players in Canada
Baseball players from Houston
Buffalo Bisons (minor league) players
Chicago White Sox players
Chicago White Sox scouts
Columbus Clippers players
Indianapolis Indians players
Jamestown Expos players
Louisburg Hurricanes baseball players
Major League Baseball second basemen
Major League Baseball shortstops
Major League Baseball third basemen
Memphis Chicks players
Montreal Expos players
New York Yankees players
West Palm Beach Expos players
Wichita Aeros players
Texas A&M Aggies baseball players